2003 Arab Unified Club Championship, officially named the 2003 Prince Faisal bin Fahd Tournament for Arab Clubs, was the 19th UAFA Club Cup, and the 2nd since the Arab Club Champions Cup and Arab Cup Winners' Cup were unified. The tournament began on 6 July and concluded on 20 July 2003, the matches took place in Cairo Stadium in Cairo, Egypt, Zamalek won the tournament and earning their first UAFA Club Cup title.

Preliminary stage

Group stage
The ten teams were drawn into two groups of five. Each group was played on one leg basis. The winners and runners-up of each group advanced to the semi-finals.

Group A

Group B

Knock-out stage

Semi-finals

Final

Winners

Top scorers

Prize money

References 
Prince Faysal bin Fahad Tournament for Arab Clubs 2003 (2nd tournament) - rsssf.com

 
2003
2003
2003–04 in Egyptian football
2003–04 in Saudi Arabian football
2003–04 in Moroccan football
2003–04 in Bahraini football
2003–04 in Jordanian football
2003–04 in Kuwaiti football
2003–04 in Algerian football
2003–04 in Iraqi football
2003–04 in Syrian football